In coding theory, expander codes form a class of error-correcting codes that are constructed from bipartite expander graphs.
Along with Justesen codes, expander codes are of particular interest since they have a constant positive rate, a constant positive relative distance, and a constant alphabet size.
In fact, the alphabet contains only two elements, so expander codes belong to the class of binary codes.
Furthermore, expander codes can be both encoded and decoded in time proportional to the block length of the code.

Expander codes
In coding theory, an expander code is a  linear block code whose parity check matrix is the adjacency matrix of a bipartite expander graph.

Definition
Let  be a -biregular graph between a set of  nodes , called variables, and a set of  nodes , called constraints.

Let  be an error-correcting code of block length .

It has been shown that nontrivial lossless expander graphs exist.  Moreover, we can explicitly construct them.

Rate
In this case, the parity check matrix has size , and hence  has rate at least .

Distance
Suppose .  Then the distance of a  expander code  is at least .

Proof
(In order to be a codeword, where  is the parity check matrix. Matrix multiplication over  then gives the desired result.)

Lemma 1 
For every  of size , .

Proof 
By the expansion property of the graph, there must be a set of  edges which go to distinct vertices. The remaining  edges make at most  neighbors not unique, so .

Corollary 
Every sufficiently small  has a unique neighbor.  This follows since .

Lemma 2 
Every subset  with  has a unique neighbor.

Proof 
Lemma 1 proves the case , so suppose . Let  such that . By Lemma 1, we know that . Then a vertex  is in  iff , and we know that , so by the first part of Lemma 1, we know .

Corollary 
Note that if a  has at least 1 unique neighbor, i.e. , then the corresponding word  corresponding to  cannot be a codeword, as it will not multiply to the all zeros vector by the parity check matrix.  By the previous argument, .  Since  is linear, we conclude that  has distance at least .

Encoding
The encoding time for an expander code is upper bounded by that of a general linear code -  by matrix multiplication.  A result due to Spielman shows that encoding is possible in  time.

Decoding
Decoding of expander codes is possible in  time when  using the following algorithm.

Let  be , and  be . Then consider the greedy algorithm:

Input: received word .
 initialize y' to y
 while there is a v in R adjacent to an odd number of vertices in V(y')
     if there is an i such that o(i) > e(i)
         flip entry i in y'
     else
         fail
Output: fail, or modified codeword .

Proof 
We show first the correctness of the algorithm, and then examine its running time.

Correctness 
We must show that the algorithm terminates with the correct codeword when the received codeword is within half the code's distance of the original codeword. The following lemma will prove useful.

Lemma 3 

Proof 
By Lemma 1, we know that .

So, if we have not yet reached a codeword, then there will always be some vertex to flip.  Next, we show that the number of errors can never increase beyond .

Lemma 4 

Proof 
Since , the initial number of unsatisfied vertices is at most , by the graph's -regularity. If we reached a string with  errors, then by Lemma 1, there would be at least   unique neighbors, which means there would be at least  unsatisfied vertices, a contradiction.

(Were it not at a codeword, there would be some vertex to flip). Since the code has distance  (since ), the codeword it terminates on must be the correct codeword, since the number of bit flips is less than half the distance (so we couldn't have traveled far enough to reach any other codeword).

Complexity 
We now show that the algorithm can achieve linear time decoding. Note that  is also constant for known constructions.

 Pre-processing: It takes  time to compute whether each vertex in  has an odd or even number of neighbors.
 Each Iteration: We simply remove the first list element. Thus each iteration takes  time.
 As argued above, the total number of iterations is at most .

See also
 Expander graph
 Low-density parity-check code
 Linear time encoding and decoding of error-correcting codes
 ABNNR and AEL codes

Notes
This article is based on Dr. Venkatesan Guruswami's course notes.

References

Error detection and correction
Coding theory
Capacity-approaching codes